This table shows an overview of the protected heritage sites in the Walloon town Vaux-sur-Sûre. This list is part of Belgium's national heritage.

|}

See also 
 List of protected heritage sites in Luxembourg (Belgium)
Vaux-sur-Sûre

References
 Belgian heritage register: Direction générale opérationnelle - Aménagement du territoire, Logement, Patrimoine et Energie (DG4)
 www.dglive.be

Vaux-sur-Sure
Vaux-sur-Sûre